Xhosacetus is a genus of ziphiid cetaceans with a single species, Xhosacetus hendeysi. It was classified from fossils found off the coast of the Kerguelen islands in 1,145 meter deep water.

References

Miocene cetaceans
Ziphiids
Fossil taxa described in 2007